Martin William Wallace (born 16 November 1948) is a retired Church of England bishop. He was the Bishop of Selby from 2003 to 2013.

Early life
He was trained for the priesthood at King's College London (Winchester scholarship, Bachelor of Divinity {BDHons}, Associate of King's College {AKC}), spending his final year at St Augustine's College, Canterbury.

Religious life
He was ordained in 1972 he began his career with a curacy at St Alban Attercliffe in the Diocese of Sheffield and was then successively vicar of St Mark, Forest Gate, rural dean of Newham, priest in charge of St Thomas Bradwell-on-Sea and St Lawrence, St Lawrence, Newland, and chaplain to St Peter on the Wall, Bradwell-on-Sea, and industrial chaplain to Bradwell Power Station and Archdeacon of Colchester before appointment to the episcopate.

Wallace was consecrated on 4 December 2003 at York Minster. From 2003 to 2013, he served as the Bishop of Selby, a suffragan bishop in the Diocese of York. In November 2013, he retired; and  he lives in Bridlington, Yorkshire.

His works include Healing Encounters in the City (1987), City Prayers (1994), Pocket Celtic Prayers (1996), and A Celtic Resource Book (1998). In addition to writing, he is also a keen garden designer.

Styles
 The Reverend Martin Wallace (1972–1989)
 The Reverend Canon Martin Wallace (1989–1997)
 The Venerable Martin Wallace (1997–2003)
 The Right Reverend Martin Wallace (2003–present)

References

1948 births
Living people
Alumni of the Theological Department of King's College London
Associates of King's College London
Bishops of Selby
Archdeacons of Colchester
21st-century Church of England bishops